Christopher John Fuller is an emeritus professor of anthropology at the London School of Economics and a Fellow of the British Academy. He has studied and written extensively about the people of India, particularly with regard to subjects such as Hinduism, the caste system, and the relationship between globalisation and the middle-classes.

Career
Fuller was a lecturer in the Department of Social Anthropology at the University of Manchester prior to holding a similar position as lecturer in anthropology at the London School of Economics (LSE) between 1979–87. He was a reader in anthropology at the LSE between 1987–94 and has been an emeritus professor of anthropology there since 2009.

Fuller's primary area of field research has been the state of Tamil Nadu, particularly between 1976–2001 at the Hindu temple in Madurai that is dedicated to Minakshi. His first fieldwork was among the Nair and Syrian Christian communities of Kerala in 1971–72. Fuller has also conducted fieldwork in Chennai (middle-class managers and software professionals, 2003–05) and on Tamil Brahmins (2005–08). Other areas of research have examined popular Hinduism and Hindu nationalism, the caste system and the history of anthropology in British India.

Fuller was elected a Fellow of the British Academy in 2007.

Publications 
Fuller's publications include:

 (co-editor, with Véronique Bénéï)

 (with Haripriya Narasimhan)

References

External links 

Fellows of the British Academy
People associated with the University of Manchester
Academics of the London School of Economics
British anthropologists
Social anthropologists
Historians of India
Date of birth missing (living people)
Living people
Year of birth missing (living people)